Dakula Arabani (born 1938) is a Filipino former swimmer. He competed in two events at the 1956 Summer Olympics.

References

External links

1938 births
Living people
Filipino male swimmers
Olympic swimmers of the Philippines
Swimmers at the 1956 Summer Olympics
Place of birth missing (living people)
Asian Games medalists in swimming
Asian Games silver medalists for the Philippines
Swimmers at the 1958 Asian Games
Medalists at the 1958 Asian Games
21st-century Filipino people
20th-century Filipino people